Erik Charles McMillan (born May 3, 1965) is a former American football defensive back. He played for the New York Jets from 1988 until 1992, Philadelphia Eagles (1993), Cleveland Browns (1993), and Kansas City Chiefs (1993). McMillan was selected to the Pro Bowl in 1988 and 1989.  In 1988, McMillan was named the NFL Defensive Rookie of the Year by the Associated Press.  He led the AFC in interceptions that year with eight. McMillan was the first Jets player in team history to play in the Pro Bowl his first two seasons.

He is the son of former St. Louis Cardinals Pro Bowl tackle Ernie McMillan, and first cousin of Howard Richards, former first round pick of the Dallas Cowboys in 1981.

References

1965 births
Living people
Players of American football from St. Louis
American football cornerbacks
American football safeties
Missouri Tigers football players
New York Jets players
Cleveland Browns players
Kansas City Chiefs players
Philadelphia Eagles players
National Football League Defensive Rookie of the Year Award winners
American Conference Pro Bowl players